The Church of St Peter is the Church of England parish church of Englishcombe, Somerset, England. It is a Grade I listed building.

History
St Peter's was probably built for Robert de Gournay in the 12th century. The church was given to the Cluniac Priory of Bermondsey in 1112 by the Lady Hawisia de Gournay, and by the Cluniacs to the monks of Bath in 1239.

The church has Norman arches and leper holes in the porch, which would have enabled lepers to hear the sermon without coming into contact with the rest of the congregation. On either side of the chancel are corbel tables depicting animals and people.

The parish is in the benefice of Bath St Barnabas with Englishcombe.

See also
 Grade I listed buildings in Bath and North East Somerset
 List of Somerset towers
 List of ecclesiastical parishes in the Diocese of Bath and Wells

References

Further reading
 [DEAD LINK]

External links

12th-century church buildings in England
Church of England church buildings in Bath and North East Somerset
Grade I listed buildings in Bath and North East Somerset
Grade I listed churches in Somerset